The 2015 Ebonyi State House of Assembly election was held on April 11, 2015, to elect members of the Ebonyi State House of Assembly in Nigeria. All the 24 seats were up for election in the Ebonyi State House of Assembly.

Results

Izzi West 
PDP candidate Francis Ogbonnaya Nwifuru won the election.

Onicha East 
PDP candidate Odefa Obasi Odefa won the election.

Ezza North West 
PDP candidate Victor Nwite won the election.

Afikpo North West 
PDP candidate Ikoro Kingsley Ogbonnaya won the election.

Ebonyi North West 
PDP candidate Aleke Victor Umoke won the election.

Ezza South 
PDP candidate Chris Ususlor won the election.

Ohaozara West 
PDP candidate Onu Nwonye won the election.

Ezza North East 
PDP candidate Nwobashi Joseph won the election.

Afikpo South West 
PDP candidate Nkemka Okoro Onuma won the election.

Izzi East 
LP candidate Anthony Nwegede won the election.

Abakaliki North 
PDP candidate Okpo Franca Chinyere won the election.

Ikwo North 
PDP candidate Nwuruku Humphrey Alieze won the election.

Ohaukwu South 
PDP candidate Oselebe Ebiaga Christian won the election.

Ebonyi North East 
PDP candidate Ezeoma Benjamin won the election.

Afikpo South East 
PDP candidate Chidi Ejem won the election.

Ikwo South 
PDP candidate Ogiji Imo Chike won the election.

Ishielu South 
PDP candidate Julius Ifeanyi Nwokpo won the election.

Ivo 
PDP candidate Oliver Osi won the election.

Ohaozara East 
PDP candidate Ude Augusta Chika won the election.

Ohaukwu North 
PDP candidate Frank Nwaka Onwe won the election.

Onicha West 
PDP candidate Valentine Okike Uzo won the election.

Abakaliki South 
PDP candidate Luke Nkwegu won the election.

Ishielu North 
PDP candidate Ali Okechukwu won the election.

Afikpo North East 
PPA candidate Maria Ude Nwachi won the election.

References 

2015 Nigerian House of Assembly elections
Ebonyi State elections